The 1974 Bavarian Tennis Championships was a men's Grand Prix tennis circuit tournament held in Munich, West Germany which was played on outdoor clay courts. It was the 58th edition of the tournament and was held from 13 May through 19 May 1974. Seventh-seeded Jürgen Fassbender won the singles title.

Finals

Singles

 Jürgen Fassbender defeated  François Jauffret 6–2, 5–7, 6–1, 6–4
 It was Fassbender's only singles title of the year and the 2nd of his career.

Doubles

 Antonio Muñoz /  Manuel Orantes defeated  Jürgen Fassbender /  Hans-Jürgen Pohmann 2–6, 6–4, 7–6, 6–2
 It was Muñoz's 2nd title of the year and the 2nd of his career. It was Orantes's 2nd title of the year and the 22nd of his career.

References

External links 
 ITF tournament edition details
 ATP tournament profile
 Official website

 
Bavarian International Tennis Championships
Bavarian Tennis Championships
Bavarian Tennis Championships
Bavarian Tennis Championships